Martha Plimpton (born November 16, 1970) is an American actress. Her feature-film debut was in Rollover (1981); she subsequently rose to prominence in the Richard Donner film The Goonies (1985). She has also appeared in The Mosquito Coast (1986), Shy People (1987), Running on Empty (1988), Parenthood (1989), Samantha (1992), Raising Hope (2010), Small Town Murder Songs (2011), Frozen II (2019) and Mass (2021).

She is recognized on Broadway for her roles in The Coast of Utopia (2006–2007), Shining City (2006–2007), Top Girls (2007–2008), and Pal Joey (2008–2009). Other theatre productions in which she has performed include The Playboy of the Western World, A Midsummer Night's Dream, The Glass Menagerie, The Sisters Rosensweig, and Uncle Vanya. She returned to Broadway in the fall of 2014 in a revival of A Delicate Balance, and starred in the ABC sitcom The Real O'Neals from March 2016 to March 2017.

She played Virginia Chance in the Fox sitcom Raising Hope, which earned her a Primetime Emmy Award nomination for Outstanding Lead Actress in a Comedy Series. She has also received three Tony Award nominations, as well as a Primetime Emmy Award nomination for Outstanding Guest Actress in a Drama Series in 2002, and again in 2012 as attorney Patti Nyholm in the CBS legal drama The Good Wife, the latter of which she won.

Early life

Plimpton was born in New York City. She is the daughter of actors Keith Carradine and Shelley Plimpton. Her parents met while performing in the original Broadway run of Hair. Her paternal grandfather was actor John Carradine. She is an eighth cousin once removed of writer and editor George Plimpton. She is also related to cartoonist Bill Plympton, despite the different spelling. She attended the Professional Children's School in Manhattan. Her first stage appearance was when her mother brought her on stage in costume for the curtain call of the short-lived Broadway play The Leaf People then another play in The Ass and the Heart.

Career

1980s
Plimpton began her career as a model, securing an early 1980s campaign for Calvin Klein, making an impression as a sophisticated but tomboyish little girl. She made her feature film debut in 1981 with a small role in the film Rollover. In 1984, she appeared in the Deep South drama The River Rat opposite Tommy Lee Jones, as his "hoydenish daughter". Her breakthrough performance was as Stef Steinbrenner in the 1985 film The Goonies. She also appeared that year in the sitcom Family Ties. This began Plimpton being cast in the role of a rebellious tomboy, beginning with her performance as the Reverend Spellgood (Andre Gregory)'s daughter in the 1986 film The Mosquito Coast, starring Harrison Ford. The critically praised but commercially unsuccessful 1987 film Shy People  was followed by a performance in the 1988 ensemble comedy Stars and Bars. This was released shortly before Running on Empty, an Oscar-nominated film, in which Plimpton appeared opposite River Phoenix, her boyfriend, both 17–18 years of age, like their characters. For this role, she was nominated for a Young Artist Award.

In her late teenaged years, Plimpton was also active in theater, performing in regional theater in Seattle, Washington, where her mother was living at the time. She also began a career making small independent film appearances with supporting roles in big-budget films. She appeared in the 1988 Woody Allen film Another Woman. She starred as a cancer patient in the German film Zwei Frauen (1990) (released in America as Silence Like Glass). The film was nominated for a German Film Award as Best Fiction Film. Plimpton shaved her head to play a cancer patient in Zwei Frauen. She played the independent teenage daughter of Dianne Wiest's character in Parenthood. Parenthood grossed over $126 million and received two Oscar nominations, one of her most successful movie appearances since The Goonies.

1990s
Plimpton appeared in the Robert De Niro 1990 film Stanley & Iris in a supporting role. She also appeared in the 1991 TV movie A Woman At War in the lead role as Helene Moskiewicz. Plimpton played the starring role of Samantha in the film Samantha (1992). She appeared as an activist in the independent film Inside Monkey Zetterland released in 1993. She appeared in the television film Daybreak (1993, HBO). She appeared in the Showtime television film Chantilly Lace. She had a featured role in the film Josh and S.A.M. (1993) as a runaway who takes care of the two boys. She played the lead in The Beans of Egypt, Maine, based on the Carolyn Chute novel. Plimpton also appeared as herself in the independent film by Eric Schaeffer My Life's in Turnaround (1993), a movie about filmmakers trying to make a movie. She appeared as a close friend of radical feminist Valerie Solanas in the film I Shot Andy Warhol (1996).

In 1997, the Showtime Network cast Plimpton as the female lead in a television film, The Defenders: Payback. Two more episodes (The Defenders: Choice of Evils and The Defenders: Taking the First) were aired in 1998. This show was a retooling of the classic television show by the same name, and the characters were descendants of Lawrence Preston, a role reprised by actor E.G. Marshall. Plimpton played the granddaughter, M.J. Preston.
 The intent was to spin the program off as a series, but Marshall died in 1998. The decision was made to not continue production due to Marshall's death. Plimpton became involved with the Steppenwolf Theatre Company in Chicago, appearing in Hedda Gabler (2001) among others. She appeared in the John Waters film Pecker in 1998. The film received mixed reviews—for example, the SF Gate reviewer wrote, "...Waters' patented brand of off-color fun is watered down", but wrote that Plimpton's work was "solid". The 1999 film 200 Cigarettes received generally negative reviews, but the AllMovie reviewer wrote of Plimpton: "...woefully underappreciated Martha Plimpton gets laughs as a bundle of neuroses who grows more and more stressed out as people fail to appear for her party..." In 1999, Plimpton had a recurring role in the sixth season of the NBC medical drama ER as Meg Corwyn.

2000s
In 2001, she starred in The Sleepy Time Gal. In 2002, she appeared in the documentary Searching for Debra Winger and was nominated for a Primetime Emmy Award for her guest appearance on the television drama Law & Order: Special Victims Unit. Plimpton was the voice of Miss Crumbles in the 2004 animated film Hair High by Bill Plympton. In 2004, she guest-starred in an episode of 7th Heaven. She wrote the episode of the show entitled "Red Socks", which aired in 2005. She had a recurring role in the NBC show Surface (2005–06). From October 2006 to May 2007, she was in the stage play The Coast of Utopia, a trilogy of plays by Tom Stoppard at Lincoln Center. She won a Drama Desk Award and was nominated for a Tony award, Featured Actress in a Play. From August to September 2007, Plimpton appeared in A Midsummer Night's Dream in the Public Theater Shakespeare in the Park production as "Helena".

She co-founded a production company, Everything is Horrible, which has produced short films for the Internet. Plimpton received her second nomination for a Tony Award in 2008, Best Performance by a Featured Actress In a Play, for her work in Top Girls at the Biltmore Theater. In November 2008, she earned a positive review from Ben Brantley in The New York Times for her role as Gladys Bumps in the Roundabout Theatre Company production of Pal Joey on Broadway. "...the ever-daring Ms. Plimpton exudes a been-there, frowzy sensuality that summons a host of hard-bitten dames from 1930s movie melodramas. Leading the nightclub act 'That Terrific Rainbow,' she has the period style down pat and a more than passable voice." She received her third consecutive Tony nomination, for Best Featured Actress in a Musical. Plimpton appeared in the 2008 Entertainment Weekly photo issue spread as one of "The Hardest Working Actors In Showbiz". Plimpton said in the write-up, "I went to jury duty the other day, and somebody said, 'You always play drug addicts!' I've played a few on TV, and I imagine because the shows get replayed, it seems like more. But yeah, people tend to see me as this pregnant teenage heroin addict."

2010s
In November 2009, Plimpton signed on for the Fox sitcom Raising Hope. The show premiered on September 21, 2010, receiving strong reviews for Plimpton and the pilot. The New York Times called Raising Hope "the most promising of the best new fall shows", and said "Plimpton isn't the only reason Raising Hope could be the best new sitcom of the season, but she is the main reason." Plimpton was nominated for the Primetime Emmy Award for Outstanding Lead Actress in a Comedy Series for her portrayal of Virginia Chance in Raising Hope. She had a recurring role in the CBS legal drama The Good Wife from 2009 to 2013, playing attorney Patti Nyholm, who appeared through four seasons. Her performance earned her a Primetime Emmy Award for Outstanding Guest Actress in a Drama Series in 2012. Plimpton sang "God Bless America" during the seventh inning stretch of Game 3 of the 2010 World Series in Texas on Fox, October 30, 2010. On December 15, 2010, Chicago's Steppenwolf Theatre announced that Plimpton would be the guest of honor at their second-annual "Salute to Women in the Arts".

In 2010, she starred in Ed Gass-Donnelly's independent crime thriller Small Town Murder Songs, and was given a trophy for best actress by the Whistler Film Festival. In 2014, Plimpton returned to Broadway as Julia, the daughter of Glenn Close and John Lithgow in a revival of Edward Albee's A Delicate Balance. The limited engagement ran 18 weeks at the Golden Theatre. Plimpton starred in The Real O'Neals, an ABC sitcom that premiered on March 2, 2016. In July 2019, it was revealed that Plimpton had left the Steppenwolf Theater ensemble. In September 2019, it was revealed that Plimpton would voice Yelena in Frozen II.

Personal life

In 1985, Plimpton met actor River Phoenix. They did not initially get along well, but began a romantic relationship in February 1986 while co-starring in Peter Weir's The Mosquito Coast. They went on to co-star in the Sidney Lumet film Running on Empty. Their relationship ended in June 1989 due to Phoenix's substance abuse. Nonetheless, they sustained a close friendship until his death in 1993. Plimpton later stated, "When we split up, a lot of it was that I had learned that screaming, fighting, and begging wasn't going to change him. He had to change himself, and he didn't want to yet."

Plimpton resides part-time in London, her visa allowing her to stay until 2024.

Political campaigns
Plimpton is an abortion-rights campaigner who has lobbied Congress on behalf of Planned Parenthood and is on the board of directors of the women's-rights organization "A Is For"; according to the organization's website, Plimpton has been politically active in abortion rights since her teenage years and speaks at campuses and rallies.   In 2014, Plimpton wrote a lengthy article decrying both U.S. Supreme Court decisions in Burwell v. Hobby Lobby and McCullen v. Coakley and revealing in part that she herself has had an abortion more than once. She wrote that her purpose was "A) to contribute to the dismantling of an oppressive, artificial and unfair shaming of women who seek abortion care, B) make clear just how normal, common, and healthy a decision it is for the women who make it, and C) to encourage women who are part of this one third to be unashamed and come out of the abortion closet." In September 2017, Plimpton created controversy when she again said she had multiple abortions and said one she received at Planned Parenthood in Seattle was her "best one".

She has also advocated for LGBT rights causes. In a Twitter post in March 2016, she stated that transgender rights and abortion rights are linked.

Other work
In 2008, Plimpton performed a duet with singer Lucy Wainwright Roche on Roche's EP 8 More, singing the Bruce Springsteen song Hungry Heart. The two had performed the song in 2008 at Joe's Pub and later in 2008 at the Zipper Factory. In 2010, she sang another Springsteen song, "Thunder Road", on the public radio program Studio 360 with Kurt Andersen, accompanied by whistler Eric Gilliland. She has appeared multiple times as a guest on public radio's The Leonard Lopate Show, and performed in a roast of Lopate celebrating the 25th anniversary of his radio program. Plimpton is on the board of directors of The Players, a New York City social club founded in 1888 by actor Edwin Booth. In 2009, she was profiled by The New York Times for their "A Night Out With..." series, in which Plimpton hosted an evening of poker at The Players.

In January 2010, she performed a one-woman show, Martha Plimpton Sings? for the Lincoln Center's American Songbook program. This show explored her experiences growing up in 1970s New York City. Her performance, well received by critics, included songs "Jolly Coppers on Parade", "Woman Is the Nigger of the World", and The Smiths's "Ask" tied together with humorous monologues. Plimpton also narrates audiobooks, including the novels Diary by Chuck Palahniuk and Mrs. Kimble by Jennifer Haigh.

Theatre

Broadway
Source: PlaybillVault

Sixteen Wounded (2004)
Shining City (2006)
The Coast of Utopia (2007) - Nominated, Tony Award for Best Featured Actress in a Play; Won Drama Desk Award for Best Featured Actress in a Play; Won Outer Critics Circle Award for Best Featured Actress in a Play
Cymbeline (2007–2008)
Top Girls (2008) - Nominated, Tony Award for Best Featured Actress in a Play
Pal Joey (2008–2009) - Nominated, Tony Award, Best Featured Actress in a Musical; Nominated, Drama Desk Award, Best Featured Actress in a Musical
A Delicate Balance (2014–2015)

The Public Theater's Shakespeare in the Park
A Midsummer Night's Dream (2007)

Steppenwolf Theatre Company
Sources: Steppenwolf Theatre Company;

The Libertine (1996) as "Elizabeth Barry"
Playboy of the Western World (1998) as "Pegeen Mike"
The Glass Menagerie (1998) as "Laura"
Hedda Gabler (2001)
Absolution (2001) (Director)

Off Broadway
Source: Internet Off-Broadway Database

The Haggadah (1980)
Pericles, Prince of Tyre (1991)
SubUrbia (1994)
Boston Marriage (2002)
Hobson's Choice (2002) - Won Obie Award for Outstanding Performance
Flesh and Blood (2003)
The False Servant (2005)

Seattle Repertory Theatre
Sources: Steppenwolf Biography

The Heidi Chronicles (1988) as "Denise", "Clara", "Becky"
Uncle Vanya (1996) as "Sonya"
The Sisters Rosensweig
Robbers

New York Philharmonic
Company (2011 concert) as "Sarah"

London
Other Desert Cities (2014) as "Brooke Wyeth", Old Vic Theatre
Sweat (2018) as "Tracey", Donmar Warehouse                          
Shakespeare Within the Abbey (2019)
As you like it (2022) as "Jaques", @sohoplace

Filmography

Film

Television

Video games

Awards and nominations

 Nominated—Young Artist Award for Exceptional Performance by a Young Actress in a Motion Picture
 Nominated—Young Artist Award for Best Young Female Superstar in Motion Pictures
 Nominated—Independent Spirit Award for Best Supporting Female
 Nominated—Young Artist Award for Best Young Actress in a Motion Picture – Drama
 Nominated—Primetime Emmy Award for Outstanding Guest Actress in a Drama Series
 Nominated—Primetime Emmy Award for Outstanding Guest Actress in a Drama Series
 Nominated—Critics' Choice Television Award for Best Guest Performer in a Drama Series
 Nominated—Satellite Award for Best Actress – Television Series Musical or Comedy
 Nominated—Critics' Choice Television Award for Best Actress in a Comedy Series (2011–12)
 Nominated—Primetime Emmy Award for Outstanding Lead Actress in a Comedy Series

References

Further reading

External links

 
 
 
 

Living people
American child actresses
American film actresses
American abortion-rights activists
American stage actresses
American television actresses
Drama Desk Award winners
American LGBT rights activists
Obie Award recipients
People from the Upper West Side
Carradine family
20th-century American actresses
21st-century American actresses
Primetime Emmy Award winners
Activists from New York (state)
Steppenwolf Theatre Company players
People from Brooklyn
1970 births